Shio II was a 15th-century Georgian prelate mentioned as the Catholicos Patriarch of Georgia in the documents dating from 1440 to 1443/47. Shio was a close associate of King Alexander I of Georgia, with whom he cooperated to restore the kingdom from the effects of the disastrous invasions by Timur earlier that century.

Biography
Shio's tenure is preceded and succeeded by those of the catholicos named David, whom traditional lists of the Georgian prelates, such as those compiled by Michel Tamarati and Roin Metreveli, and that accepted by the Georgian Orthodox Church, identify as David III (1435–1439) and David IV (1443/47–1457), respectively. Some historians, especially Cyril Toumanoff, see in these names one and the same person, David II, a son of King Alexander I. Toumanoff, further, conjectures that Shio was a locum tenens for David II, who was designated by his father to become the prelate of the Georgian church at a very young age.

References

Notes

Catholicoses and Patriarchs of Georgia (country)
15th-century Eastern Orthodox archbishops
15th-century people from Georgia (country)